Gianfranco Facchineri (born 27 April 2002) is a Canadian soccer player who plays for Windsor City FC in League1 Ontario

Early life
Facchineri was born and raised in Windsor, Ontario, where he played youth soccer with Windsor Ciociaro SC at age five. He later played with the Windsor FC Nationals and Migichan's Vardar SC. He played with the Ontario provincial team at U14 and U15 levels. He then briefly joined the Toronto FC Academy. In 2016, he was invited to join the Vancouver Whitecaps Academy, but declined the opportunity as he felt he was too young. Two years later in August 2018, he then joined the Vancouver Whitecaps Academy. He began playing with the Whitecaps U17 and U19 sides, before moving to their development side in 2019. In August 2019, he began training with the Whitecaps first team. In 2019, he was the Whitecaps FC BMO RESP Academy Male Player award recipient.

University career
In 2022, he began attending the University of Windsor, where he played for the men's soccer team. He scored his first goal on 18 September 2022 against the McMaster Marauders. On 25 September 2022, he scored two goals in a 9-0 victory over the Algoma Thunderbirds to help Windsor win their first game of the season.

Club career
In January 2020, Facchineri signed a first-team Homegrown Player contract with the Whitecaps.  In July 2020, he was loaned to Atlético Ottawa in the Canadian Premier League. He made his professional debut on 19 August 2020, against Valour FC. In August 2021, he was loaned to USL Championship side San Diego Loyal SC. In February 2022, he was released by the Whitecaps, with the club buying out the remainder of his contract.

In 2022, he played in the League1 Ontario Reserve Division with Tecumseh SC U21. In March 2023, he joined Windsor City FC in the League1 Ontario Premier Division.

International career
He made his debut in the Canadian youth program in 2016, at the age of 13, attending a U15 identification camp. In 2019, he was named to the Canadian U17 team for the 2019 CONCACAF U-17 Championship, where he served as team captain. On 12 May, he scored the winning penalty kick in the shootout during the quarter-finals against Costa Rica U17, to earn Canada qualification for the 2019 FIFA U-17 World Cup, for which he was also named to the squad for. Across, the two tournaments, he played every minute for the team in their seven matches.

References

External links

2002 births
Living people
Association football defenders
Canadian soccer players
Soccer people from Ontario
Sportspeople from Windsor, Ontario
Canadian people of Italian descent
Canadian expatriate soccer players
Expatriate soccer players in the United States
Canadian expatriate sportspeople in the United States
Vancouver Whitecaps FC players
Atlético Ottawa players
Canadian Premier League players
Canada men's youth international soccer players
Homegrown Players (MLS)
San Diego Loyal SC players
USL Championship players
Windsor City FC players
League1 Ontario players
Toronto FC players
University of Windsor alumni